Fouad Fajari (born 18 April 1989, in Rabat) is a Moroccan Greco-Roman wrestler. He is multiple medalist at the African Championships in the 55 kg category. At the 2013 Mediterranean Games won bronze medal. He competed in the -55kg event at the 2012 Summer Olympics in London, where he was defeated in the 1/8 finals by Håkan Nyblom from Denmark. In 2021, he competed at the 2021 African & Oceania Wrestling Olympic Qualification Tournament hoping to qualify for the 2020 Summer Olympics in Tokyo, Japan. He did not qualify at this tournament and he also failed to qualify for the Olympics at the World Olympic Qualification Tournament held in Sofia, Bulgaria.

Major results

References

External links
 

1989 births
Living people
Moroccan male sport wrestlers
Wrestlers at the 2012 Summer Olympics
Olympic wrestlers of Morocco
Mediterranean Games bronze medalists for Morocco
Mediterranean Games medalists in wrestling
Competitors at the 2013 Mediterranean Games
Competitors at the 2019 African Games
African Games medalists in wrestling
African Games silver medalists for Morocco
African Wrestling Championships medalists
Competitors at the 2022 Mediterranean Games
20th-century Moroccan people
21st-century Moroccan people